Mammillaria gigantea is a species of cactus in the subfamily Cactoideae native to Mexico. It is named for its large size.

References

Plants described in 1898
gigantea